Deir al-Dubban (from Dayr ad-Dhubban, literally, the "Monastery of the Flies") was a small Palestinian village  northwest of Hebron, near the modern village of Luzit, between Jerusalem, and Ashkelon. The village  was  depopulated in the 1948 Palestine War.

History
A possible reason behind Deir al-Dubban's name is that its ancient inhabitants worshiped Ba'l Zabub ("Lord of the Flies"), a chief Canaanite deity in the region.

Moshe Sharon, professor of early Islamic history at Hebrew University, has examined the inscriptions in the caves of Deir al-Dubban. He dates them from early 8th century C.E. to early 10th century C.E.

Ottoman era
The village was incorporated into the Ottoman Empire in 1517 with all of Palestine, and in 1596 it appeared in the tax registers as being in the Nahiya ("Subdistrict") of Al-Quds of the Liwa ("District") of Al-Quds, with a  population 72 Muslim households, an estimated  396 persons. The villagers paid  a fixed tax rate of 33,3%  on wheat, barley, olive trees, fruit trees, vineyards, goats and beehives; a total of 14,005 akçe. Half of the revenue went to a waqf.

E. Robinson reports passing Deir al-Dubban in 1838, on his way to examine caverns nearby. He noted it as a Muslim village, located in the Gaza district. Although inconclusive, Robinson, by taking Eusebius' location of the biblical Gath as being five Roman miles north of Eleutheropolis (Beit Gubrin) towards Diospolis (Lod), thought that Deir al-Dubban may have been the site of Gath-Rimmon.

The French explorer Victor Guérin visited the village in 1863, and found that it had seven or eight poor Fellahin families, while an official Ottoman village list of about 1870 showed that Der Dubban had 24 houses and a population of 79, though the population count included only men.  In 1882 the PEF's Survey of Western Palestine (SWP) noted that the village appeared as being on an ancient site, and that there were large caverns. It had a with a well to the west. Charles Warren found inscriptions, apparently in Syriac in the caves, one with a Byzantine cross engraved above it.

In 1896 the population of  Der ed-dibban was estimated to be about 249 persons.

British Mandate era
During the British Mandate period, Deir al-Dubban's main economic activities were rainfed agriculture and animal husbandry. As a customary practice, farmland was divided into eastern and western sections; one section was planted on during a particular season, while the other remained a fallow. Adjacent to the farmland were fig orchards and grape vineyards.

In the 1922 census of Palestine conducted by the British Mandate authorities, Dair al-Dubban had a population of 454 inhabitants, all Muslims, increasing in the 1931 census of Palestine to 543, still all Muslim, in 112 inhabited houses.

In the 1945 statistics, Deir al-Dubban had a population of 730 Muslims and a land area of 7,784 dunams. 5358 dunams were used for cereals, while 58 dunams were built-up (urban) land.

1948 and aftermath
During the 1948 Arab-Israeli War, on October 24, Israeli forces belonging to the Givati Brigade captured Deir ad-Dubban in a northward push in Operation Yoav. Most of the inhabitants fled the village before the arrival of Israeli forces, those that remained were expelled. The moshav of Luzit was established on the village's northeastern lands in 1955. According to Palestinian historian Walid Khalidi, "the village's old roads are easily identifiable. There are also remnants of stone terraces and a cave."

See also
Depopulated Palestinian locations in Israel

References

Bibliography

External links
Welcome To Dayr al-Dubban
Dayr al-Dubban, Zochrot
Survey of Western Palestine, Map 16: IAA, Wikimedia commons

Arab villages depopulated during the 1948 Arab–Israeli War
District of Hebron